Sir Peter James Scott Moon  (1 April 1928 – 10 July 1991) was a British diplomat.

Career
Peter James Scott Moon was educated at Uppingham School and Worcester College, Oxford. He entered the Home Office in 1952 but transferred to the then Commonwealth Relations Office in 1954, serving in South Africa and Ceylon and as private secretary to the Secretary of State for Commonwealth Relations. He then joined the Diplomatic Service and served at the UK mission to the United Nations in New York 1965–69, at the Foreign and Commonwealth Office 1969–70, as private secretary (foreign affairs) to the prime minister 1970–72, and on the international staff of NATO in Brussels 1972–75. After a posting to Cairo 1975–78, he was High Commissioner in Tanzania 1978–82 (and non-resident Ambassador to Madagascar 1978–79), High Commissioner in Singapore 1982–85, and Ambassador to Kuwait 1985–87.

Moon was appointed CMG in the New Year Honours of 1979 and knighted KCVO in the same year.

References
MOON, Sir Peter (James Scott), Who Was Who, A & C Black, 1920–2007; online edn, Oxford University Press, Dec 2012
Sir Peter Moon (obituary), The Times, London, 15 July 1991, page 16

1928 births
1991 deaths
People educated at Uppingham School
Alumni of Worcester College, Oxford
High Commissioners of the United Kingdom to Tanzania
Ambassadors of the United Kingdom to Madagascar
High Commissioners of the United Kingdom to Singapore
Ambassadors of the United Kingdom to Kuwait
Knights Commander of the Royal Victorian Order
Companions of the Order of St Michael and St George
Civil servants in the Commonwealth Relations Office